The RPG-75 is a portable, disposable, single-shot anti-tank weapon, developed in the 1970s in Czechoslovakia. It fires a 68 mm grenade (the projectile is not a rocket) with an effective range of 300 meters and maximum range of 1000 meters. It resembles the American M72 LAW rocket launcher. This RPG is recommended to be used against light tanks and armoured tracked vehicles.

Versions
RPG-75-TB 
Improved version with thermobaric projectile, introduced in 2009.

RPG-Nh-75
Designated for training ball firing. Identical with combat version, only with inert projectile.

RPG-Cv-75
Designated for firing practise. Contains embedded 7.65 mm barrel - reusable.

RPG-Šk-75
Designated for firing preparation, target aiming and trigerring. Contains no explosive or spotting charge.

Specifications
Length (folded for transport): 633 mm
Length (combat ready): 890 mm
Weight: 3.2 kg
Weight of projectile: 0.8 kg
Weight of explosive: 0.32 kg
Bore diameter: 68 mm
Maximum effective range against moving target: 200 metres
Maximum effective range against fixed target: 300 metres
Maximum range: 1  000 metres
Penetration: 330 mm of rolled homogeneous armour (RHA)
Time of flight to autodestruction: 3 - 6 second
Muzzle velocity: 189 metres per second
Operating temperature: −40 to +50 °C
Ammunition: projectile with HEAT warhead

Users

: SWAPO

References

Anti-tank rockets
Rocket-propelled grenade launchers
Weapons of Czechoslovakia